Clément-Auguste Andrieux (7 December 1829, Paris– 16 May 1880, Samois-sur-Seine) was a French artist and illustrator.

In 1870 Andrieux worked for Le Monde Illustré during the Franco Prussian War.

Works

 A lithographic series on National Guards.

illustrated
Cherville, Histoire d'un trop bon chien, Hetzel.
Harriet Beecher-Stowe, La Case de l'Oncle Tom, Perrotin, 1853.

References

1829 births
1880 deaths
French illustrators
19th-century French painters
French male painters
19th-century French male artists